The Vym (Vym'; Komi: Емва, Emva) is a river in the Komi Republic, Russia. It is a tributary of the Vychegda in the basin of the Northern Dvina.

The Vym has its sources in the southern foothills of the Timan Ridge. It runs towards the south, through a flat taiga landscape of coniferous forests and bogs. In the upper reaches of the river there are stretches of rapids. It joins the Vychegda at the settlement of Ust-Vym. The river is used for floating of timber and wood products, and it is navigable on its lower reaches.

Its main tributaries are, from the right: Vorykva, Edva, Pozheg and Chub, and from the left: Koin and Veslyana.

References

Rivers of the Komi Republic